The Bihari Muslim minority in Bangladesh were subject to persecution during and after the 1971 Bangladesh Liberation War (called the Civil War in Pakistan), experiencing widespread discrimination. Biharis were ethnic Urdu-speakers and largely maintained a pro-Pakistani stance, supported the Pakistan Armed Forces and opposed the independence of Bangladesh and the Bengali language movement. Biharis faced reprisals from Mukti Bahini and militias and from 500,000 to 550,000 were killed.
Bihari representatives claim a figure of 600,000 Biharis killed.

The Supreme Court of Bangladesh ruled Biharis eligible for Bangladesh citizenship in 1972, but about 500,000 chose repatriation to Pakistan. Some repatriation was implemented by the Red Cross over a number of years, but in 1978 the Pakistani government stripped Pakistanis remaining in Bangladesh of Pakistani citizenship. Researchers (such as Sumit Sen) maintain that the Pakistani government's denationalisation of the Biharis and reluctance to rehabilitate them in Pakistan are sufficient evidence of persecution to warrant refugee status. The Biharis have also faced institutionalised discrimination linked to their citizenship status, and many live in squalor in refugee camps.

History

Partition violence
Bihar (now a state in eastern India) was plagued by communal violence between Muslims and Hindus due to partition, along with the other former territories of British India. More than 30,000 Biharis were killed in October and November 1946, and it is estimated that up to one million migrated to East Pakistan. In the aftermath of the 1946 riot in Bihar, Jinnah said 'I never dreamt that in my lifetime I shall see Pakistan in being, but the tragedy of Bihar has brought it about'. The Muslim League organised the rehabilitation of the Bihari refugees in Sindh. The arrival of Bihari refugees in camps in Sindh and Bengal in 1946 paralleled the later movement of refugees in 1947.

Sheikh Mujibur Rahman (then a student leader) toured affected villages in Bihar with his relief team, and was moved to ask Bihari refugees to move to East Bengal in 1947.

Migration from Bihar 
The 1947 partition of India displaced between 12 and 18 million people; millions of Muslims migrated from India to Pakistan while millions of Hindus and Sikhs migrated from Pakistan to India.

Background 
One reason cited for communal violence between Biharis and Bengalis was Bengali opposition to Urdu as a national language, which resulted in the Bengali Language Movement and an economic downturn. The relatively secular attitude of East Pakistan increased tensions between the two communities and the two provinces of the country. In the 1970 general elections Biharis predominantly supported the mostly West Pakistani Muslim League over the Awami League (overwhelmingly supported by Bengalis), and played an active anti-secessionist role in the liberation war.

Biharis supported the Pakistan Armed Forces during the 1971 Bangladesh Liberation War, comprising majorities in armed paramilitary groups such as Al-Shams, Razakars and Al-Badr (held responsible for the genocidal campaign against Bengali nationalists, civilians, religious and ethnic minorities). News outlets such as the BBC have published death-toll estimates by independent researchers varying from 200,000 to 500,000. Scholars such as R. J. Rummel and Matthew White estimate the total Bengali civilian death toll at 1.5 million. The casualty figure estimated by Pakistan is 25,000, as reported by the Hamoodur Rahman Commission.

Having generated unrest among Bengalis, Biharis became the target of retaliation. The Minorities at Risk project puts the number of Biharis killed during the war at 1,000; however, R. J. Rummel cites a "likely" figure of 150,000.

Another cause of Bengali reprisal could be the collaboration of Biharis with the Pakistan Army, which participated in mass rape of Bengalis during the Bangladesh Liberation War.  Susan Brownmiller has estimated the number of rape victims of the Pakistan Army and its collaborators during the war at 200,000 to 400,000 women and children.

Many scholars have used such events to understate, marginalize and even justify atrocities against non-Bengalis or to suppress the memory of atrocities committed against them.

Events 
In early March 1971, 300 Biharis were slaughtered in rioting by Bengali mobs in Chittagong. The massacre was used by the Pakistan Army as a justification to launch Operation Searchlight against the Bengali nationalist movement. Biharis were massacred in Jessore, Panchabibi and Khulna (where, in March 1972, 300 to 1,000 Biharis were killed and their bodies thrown into a nearby river).

The magnitude of anti-Bihari attacks by Bengalis throughout the war are contested. Bengali sources admit the death of a few thousand to 30,000 or 40,000 non-Bengalis. According to a white paper released by the Pakistani government, the Awami League killed 64,000 Biharis and West Pakistanis. R. J. Rummel, a historian with the University of Hawaii, gives a range of 50,000 to 500,000 Biharis killed and concludes at a prudent figure of 150,000 murdered by Bengalis overall. International estimates vary from 20,000 to 200,000. In June 1971, Bihari representatives put forward a figure of 500,000 Biharis killed by Bengalis.

Aftermath

Mukti Bahini 
Allegations have been made that Mukti Bahini, the Bengali resistance force, backed by Indian government, from East Pakistan, killed non-Bengalis (primarily West Pakistanis and Biharis) in the aftermath of the Bangladesh Liberation War. Sarmila Bose, in her book Dead Reckoning: Memories of the 1971 Bangladesh War, accused Bangladeshi liberation accounts of ignoring atrocities against Urdu-speaking people in East Pakistan. However, Bose's book is considered controversial. Her book was highly criticized by many historians, journalists and the writers.

Refugee crisis 
The Bangladesh government announced Presidential Order 149 in 1972, offering citizenship to Biharis. According to government sources 600,000 Biharis accepted the offer, and 539,669 opted to return to Pakistan. But according to historian Partha Ghosh approximately 470,000 Biharis out of a total of 700,000 Biharis opted to be repatriated to Pakistan through the International Red Cross. Several groups in Pakistan have urged their government to accept the Biharis.

Surur Hoda, a Socialist leader, played an active role in solving the refugee crisis. He organized a delegation, headed by British Labour Party politician David Ennals and Ben Whitaker, which encouraged many refugees to return to Pakistan. In a 1974 agreement, Pakistan accepted 170,000 Bihari refugees; however, the repatriation process has since stalled.

Organisations such as Refugees International have urged both governments to "grant citizenship to the hundreds of thousands of people who remain without effective nationality". During his 2002 trip to Bangladesh, Pakistan president Pervez Musharraf said he sympathised with the plight of the Biharis but could not allow them to emigrate to Pakistan. As of 2006, the Office of the United Nations High Commissioner for Refugees (UNHCR) had not addressed the plight of the Biharis. On 19 May 2008, the Dhaka High Court approved citizenship and voting rights for about 150,000 refugees who were minors at the time of Bangladesh's 1971 war of independence. Those born in the country since the war also gained citizenship and the right to vote.

Immigration 

Due to their initial pro-Pakistan stance, the Biharis were consistent in their wish to be repatriated to Pakistan. Initially, 83,000 Biharis (58,000 former civil servants and military personnel), members of divided families and 25,000 hardship cases were evacuated to Pakistan. By 1974, 108,000 had been transferred to Pakistan (mainly by air); by 1981, about 163,000. Both countries have signed agreements on the repatriation of stateless people, but only a few hundred have managed to go to Pakistan. Under the supervision of the UN High Commissioner for Refugees over 119,000 Biharis were airlifted to Pakistan. By 1982 Pakistan had received 169,000 Biharis. Some Biharis also entered Pakistan through illegal means. According to the UNHCR report 170,000 Biharis were repatriated after the second Delhi Agreement. In 1977, 4,790 families were repatriated; 2,800 in 1979; 7,000 in 1981; 6,000 in 1984; and 50 families in 1993. A total of approximately 178,069 Biharis were repatriated to Pakistan between 1973 and 1993.

In 1988, the Organisation of Islamic Cooperation (OIC) raised about $500 million for the repatriation and rehabilitation of Biharis to Pakistan. A special committee, the Rabita (Coordination) Trust Board, was formed by Pakistan President Muhammad Zia-ul-Haq. It received $14 million by 1992, and was requesting additional donations from Saudi Arabia and other Gulf states for the rehabilitation of Biharis.

Land allocated to Biharis in Pakistan in one colony in Mian Channu is now a slum. The Biharis were targeted by the ethnic Sindhi people during the 1980s  Karachi riots. In the Punjab province of Pakistan, ethnic Punjabis forcefully occupied shelters allocated to the Biharis.  These incidents  have prompted some Biharis to return to Bangladesh.

Present conditions 

Although many Biharis have assimilated into the Bengali population of Bangladesh, some opt to migrate to Pakistan and are  relocated to refugee camps across Bangladesh. According to one estimate, at least 250,000 Biharis are still in  Bangladesh urban refugee camps. The camps have become slums, the largest of which (known as "Geneva Camp", with over 25,000 people) is crowded and undeveloped; families up to 10 people typically live in a single room, one latrine is shared by 90 families and no more than five percent of the population has a formal education. Due to the lack of educational opportunity and poor living conditions, young men in the slums have set up an Urdu Bhashi Jubo Chhatro Shongothon (Urdu-Speaking Young Students Association) to increase educational opportunities in their community. Health and sanitation problems persist due to poor drainage and sewage systems, and the economic condition of Bihari refugees has been described in news reports and academic journals as extremely poor.

2014 Kalshi clashes
In 2014, members of the ruling Awami League, aided by police clashed with the members of the Urdu speaking community, in a bid to grab land, in Mirpur. During these clashes, nine people including eight members of a family were burnt alive by Awami League and their local Bengali supporters.

The Biharis blamed the attacks being directed by Elias Mollah, the ethnic Bengali lawmaker of Mirpur. Elias Mollah denied involvement and blamed a "vested conspiracy" against him.

Citizenship and reconciliation efforts 
In May 2003, a high court ruling in Bangladesh allowed ten Bihari refugees to obtain citizenship and voting rights. The ruling exposed a generation gap among Biharis; younger Biharis tended to be "elated", but many older people felt "despair at the enthusiasm" of the younger generation and said their true home was in Pakistan. Many Biharis now seek greater civil rights and citizenship in Bangladesh.

On 19 May 2008, the Dhaka High Court approved citizenship and voting rights for about 150,000 refugees who were minors at the time of Bangladesh's 1971 war of independence. Those born in the country since the war also gained citizenship and the right to vote. Several political parties campaigned in the camps for the Bihari vote during the 2008 general election, and the group was considered important to parties and candidates. Although the court ruling explicitly said that the Biharis are eligible to register to vote in the December 2008 elections, the Election Commission closed its rolls in August 2008 without enrolling them.

See also 

 1971 Bangladesh genocide
 Anti-Bihari sentiment
 Human rights in Bangladesh
 Stranded Pakistanis

References

Further reading 
 
 Report Hamoodur-Rahman Commission
 

Anti-Pakistan sentiment
Bangladesh–Pakistan relations
Bangladeshi war crimes
Ethnic cleansing in Asia
Human rights abuses in Bangladesh
Muhajir history
Anti-Bihari sentiment
Racism in Bangladesh
Torture in Bangladesh